Guy Paul Morin is a Canadian who was wrongly convicted of the October 1984 rape and murder of his nine-year-old next-door neighbour, Christine Jessop of Queensville, north of Toronto, Ontario. DNA testing led to a subsequent overturning of this verdict. On October 15, 2020, the Toronto Police Service announced a DNA match identifying Calvin Hoover as the one whose semen was recovered from Jessop’s underwear. Hoover killed himself in 2015.

Murder of Christine Jessop 
On October 3, 1984, Jessop was dropped off at her home from her school bus. She was supposed to meet a friend from school at a nearby park, but failed to show up. When her mother arrived home she found Christine’s school bag on the counter. In early evening after her mother had telephoned Christine’s friends and searched for the little girl herself, police were called. Her body was discovered on December 31, nearly three months later. She had been sexually assaulted and murdered.

Trials 
Morin was arrested for Jessop's murder in April 1985. He was acquitted at his first trial in 1986.  The Crown exercised its right to appeal the verdict on the grounds that the trial judge made a fundamental error in the charge to the jury. In 1987 the Court of Appeal ordered a new trial.  The retrial was delayed until 1992 by Morin's own appeals based on the Crown's non-disclosure of exculpatory evidence and by other issues, including the double jeopardy rule.

The second trial ran for nine months during 1992then the longest murder trial in Canadian historyending with Morin convicted and sentenced to life imprisonment. Unlike others convicted of murdering children after sexually abusing them, he was kept in the general population throughout his time in prison.  He was released on bail, pending his appeal, which had been allowed, in February 1993; up until his release, he was held at Kingston Penitentiary.

Acquittal and aftermath 
Improvements in DNA testing led to a test in January 1995 which excluded Morin as the murderer, just days before his appeal was to be heard. The trial for Morin's appeal of his conviction was short, with the judge giving a directed verdict of acquittal on January 23, 1995, in response to the DNA evidence that all parties agreed were accurate. This verdict led to a group of volunteers to form the Association in Defence of the Wrongly Convicted (AIDWYC), now known as Innocence Canada.

An inquiry culminating in the Kaufman Report into Morin's case also uncovered evidence of police and prosecutorial misconduct, and of misrepresentation of forensic evidence by the Ontario Centre of Forensic Sciences. Morin received $1.25 million in compensation from the Ontario government.

Identification of murderer 
On October 15, 2020, just days past the 36th anniversary of Jessop's death, police identified Jessop's murderer as Calvin Hoover based on DNA evidence and genetic genealogy. Hoover died by his own hand in 2015. He was 28 in 1984. Police said that he was an associate to the family and had a criminal record that was unrelated to the case.

See also
Overturned convictions in Canada
List of miscarriage of justice cases

References

External links
Commission on Proceedings Involving Guy Paul Morin, report from the Ontario Attorney General

Living people
Overturned convictions in Canada
Franco-Ontarian people
Place of birth missing (living people)
People from the Regional Municipality of York
People wrongfully convicted of rape
People wrongfully convicted of murder
1961 births